"Waiting Game" is a song by British pop group Swing Out Sister from their second studio album, Kaleidoscope World (1989). It was released in September 1989 as the album's third single, but was not released in the United Kingdom. It is a dance-pop song written and produced by Andy Connell and Corinne Drewery, and produced by the former two and Paul Staveley O'Duffy.

Track listing and formats

Charts

Weekly charts

References

External links
 
 
 

1989 singles
1989 songs
Swing Out Sister songs
Fontana Records singles